Kosilov is a Russian surname. Notable people with the surname include:

 Nikolay Ivanovich Kosilov (1937–2009), Russian scientist and inventor, mechanical engineer, doctor of technical sciences, professor
 Sergey Alexeyevich Kosilov (born 1982), Russian canoeist
 Sergey Sergeyevich Kosilov (born 1979), Russian football player

 Also
 Kosilov, Kursk Oblast, a khoetor in Medvensky District of Kursk Oblast

Russian-language surnames